Antolín Ortega García (born 5 November 1951, in Madrid) is a Spanish retired footballer who played as a midfielder.

External links
 
 Stats at Cadistas1910 

1951 births
Living people
Footballers from Madrid
Spanish footballers
Association football midfielders
La Liga players
Segunda División players
Real Madrid Castilla footballers
CA Osasuna players
CD Castellón footballers
Cádiz CF players
Real Betis players
Recreativo de Huelva players
Spain youth international footballers